Élections Québec is the independent office of the National Assembly of Quebec that oversees the administration of the electoral and referendum system in Quebec, Canada. It is led by the Chief Electoral Officer of Quebec (DGEQ).

Chief Electoral Officer 
The Chief Electoral Officer designates both a person and a position. The current DGEQ is Pierre Reid, who also simultaneously serves as the president of Commission de la représentation électorale (Commission of Electoral Representation). The DGEQ is also responsible for providing electors with information and ensuring transparency in the Quebec political financing system.

A former Chief Electoral Officer, Pierre F. Côté, became well known in Quebec for his warnings and reports on alleged financing and voting irregularities during the 1995 Quebec sovereignty referendum.

List of Chief Electoral Officers of Quebec
 Pierre F. Côté (May 25, 1978 – July 16, 1997)
 François Casgrain (interim) (July 16, 1997 – July 13, 1998)
 Jacques Girard (July 13, 1998 - April 21, 1999)
 Jean Jolin (interim) (April 21, 1999 - November 3, 1999)
 Francine Barry (interim) (November 3, 1999 - May 3, 2000) 
 Marcel Blanchet (May 3, 2000 - January 1, 2011)
 Jacques Drouin (January 1, 2011 – July 11, 2014)
 Pierre Reid (July 12, 2015 – Present)

See also 

 Chief Electoral Officer (Canada)
 Politics of Quebec

References

External links 
 
 Mandate and responsibilities of the Chief Electoral Officer of Québec

Quebec
Government of Quebec